Annie Denton Cridge (1825–1875) was a UK-born suffragist, socialist, lecturer, and author.  She moved to the United States around 1842 during the industrial and Victorian eras. Cridge was an author who wrote primarily about women's rights and spiritualism. In the mid-nineteenth century, spiritualism was considered the only religious group that recognized the equality of women. Ann Braude, in her book, Radical Spirits, defines spiritualism as "a new religious movement aimed at proving the immortality of the soul by establishing communication with the spirits of the dead… It provided an alternative to the established religious order. It held two attractions to thousands of Americans: rebellion against death and rebellion against authority".

Biography 
Annie Denton Cridge was born Annie Denton, in England in 1825. In the 1840s she and her brother William emigrated to America, where she married Alfred Cridge.

Cridge and her husband lived in Dayton, Ohio, and published a newspaper called the Vanguard. The Vanguard was dedicated to "spiritualism, positive reform, and progressive literature".  It was published during the crisis of faith which emerged in the nineteenth century in response to the break away from romanticism and the emergence of scientific developments. Cridge underwent her own crisis of faith, which was marked by two incidents in her early twenties that transitioned her into the literary and political spheres. When Cridge was twenty-two, she began an autobiographical series of articles titled "My Soul's Thraldom and Its Deliverance." A portion of the work was published in each edition of the Vanguard. The series discusses her rejection of her Evangelical upbringing in England, which was how her parents raised her. She said that her parents' Methodist doctrines "made heaven into hell". In chapter six of her autobiography, she writes, "Religion! call it not by that name: 'tis the demon of misery. What else could blight the silvery laugh of youth, freeze the gushings of joy and chain the soul in everlasting night!".  She struggled to find the spiritual truth, fluctuating among different perceptions of the religious practices of the day. Additionally, she underwent a life-changing occurrence in 1857, when she was twenty-three. She gave birth to a baby boy, but he only survived a few months. After her son's death, it is recorded that Cridge "saw the spirits of her own dead parents above his couch, waiting to bear his sweet spirit away. She watched her baby's spirit withdraw from his body and assume a spiritual body, with the help of his [deceased] grandparents". 

During the 1860s the Cridges worked as reformers in Washington DC. (Alfred later wrote the book "Proportional Representation including its relationship to initiative and referendum," published in 1904.) By 1870 she was living in Pennsylvania.

Cridge had a surviving son, Alfred Denton Cridge, who wrote a science fiction work: Utopia; Or, the History of an Extinct Planet, Psychometrically Explained (1884), one of the earliest U.S. science fiction novels.

Notable Works

"Man's Rights; Or, How Would You Like It? Comprising Dreams" 
Cridge published Man's Rights, a work of utopian science fiction and satire, in 1870. It is the first known feminist utopian novel written by a woman. 

The text features nine dreams experienced by a first-person female narrator. In the first seven dreams she visits the planet Mars, finding a society where traditional sex roles and stereotypes are reversed. The narrator witnesses the oppression of the men on Mars and their struggle for equality. Although initially confined to the home and strictly controlled,  they can start working towards their liberation after technological advancements free them from some of their grueling domestic chores. In the last two dreams, the narrator visits a future United States, ruled by a woman president and with an equal balance of men and women in the House and Senate. Legislators have begun to stop fining and imprisoning female prostitutes, and it is now the male clients who get arrested and sent to reformatories. A large number of women have taken up farming, and the nation has a promising economic future. The narrator concludes by asking whether this dream might not, after all, be a prophecy?

Other Notable Works 
Cridge also wrote a fictitious children's novel, titled The Crumb-Basket (1868). This book contains dozens of short stories, only a few pages each, in which she discusses science, religion, and feminism at a very basic level.  She writes as a first-person narrator, asking the children about women's rights, children's rights, and spiritualism. One of her stories, titled,"To My Boy Friends," is directed toward young boys. She asks them: Probably you have heard of women's rights. First, think of your merry sister and cousin, Lizzie or Emma, with their bright eyes and musical voices; and then tell me if you would not like them to be as happy and as free as you are when you are men and they women. Don't you think they ought to be educated as well as you; to earn as much money, and have the right to use it as their own?  Don't you think they should assist in making the laws by which they are to be governed, or to say who shall go to Congress, as much as men?Cridge also wrote autobiographical nonfiction, such as "My Soul's Thraldom and Its Deliverance" (1856), and other serial pieces, such as "Laws of Friendship," "A Story from Real Life," and obituaries about her son's death. Many of her articles can be read in the archived issues of Vanguard found at The International Association for the Preservation of Spiritualist and Occult Periodicals.

Literary significance

Literary elements 
In the spirit of the Victorian era, two literary elements Cridge used in her work are psychological realism and stream-of-consciousness. She writes through stream-of-consciousness in Man's Rights by writing a series of dreams in a first-person narrative, interrupted by her own thoughts within the dream, and also discusses her literal writing of the dream outside the narrative. For example, after inscribing her dream, she writes, "I awoke:  it was all a dream. My husband stood at my bedside. "Annie, Annie!" he said. "Awake Annie! That new girl of yours is good for nothing. You will have to rise and attend to her, else I shall have no breakfast.... I arose: and, as my husband ate his breakfast, I pondered over my strange dream", relaying her stories through a realistic rather than romantic means. Her sense perceptions, conscious and unconscious thoughts intermingle, uninterrupted by a forced narration. Additionally, Cridge focuses on the motivations and internal thoughts of characters in Man's Rights and The Crumb-Basket. Psychological realism is, therefore, discovered in her story-telling method.

Cridge also practices several elements of modern writers: writing embedded in the present culture and creative-writer-as-critic. T. S. Eliot writes that creative writing should be aware of the present culture. All of Cridge's fiction and nonfiction debates the most current issues of the time, pushing her toward the modern and further away from romanticism. Additionally, a quality of Virginia Woolf's writing is used by Cridge, creative-writer as critic. While Cridge tells children's stories that are fictional, each story has a political message embedded in her story-telling language. She appeals to children, asking them how they feel about inequality between men and women, and criticizes traditional gender stereotypes of female domesticity and fragility and male oppression of emotion. In one of her stories, she tells women to "romp, shout and dance merrily; you have two hundred and nine muscles that must be exercised. Run, and shout too; for your lungs need full breath and pure air, as much as the flowers need the dews and sunshine" merging women's rights topics with descriptive language.

Literary precepts 
The works of Annie Denton Cridge can be critically categorized with feminist writing both before and after her time. Cridge shares similarities with Christine de Pizan, a medieval creative writer who wrote a Utopian story, The Book of the City of Ladies. She wrote as a creative writer as critic, utilized satire, and interlaced religious belief into her work. Both Pizan and Cridge joined a male-dominated literary community before their time, and contributed to female Utopian literature. Lee Cullen Khanna, a feminist utopia critic, wrote that "utopias can be spiritual or religious in their effect" as they symbolize a changed society. Utopias by women "frequently mirror what women lacked and what women wanted at the time when the books were published".  In their utopian societies, women typically focus on intangible features of human existence, such as family, sexuality, and marriage.

However, Cridge was writing in the "feminine" phase between 1790 and 1880. Characteristically of feminist writers of the era, she denied her place as an "angel of the house," and joined writers such as Ann Radcliffe, Mary Shelley, and Jane Austen as writers of the novel. However, her writing was transitional, crossing over into the feminist and female phases. She was a less-progressive precursor to Mina Loy's Feminist Manifesto during the feminist era between 1880 and 1930. Their primary connection was a focus on marriage reform. Loy writes, "The value of man is assessed entirely according to his use or interest to the community, the value of woman depends entirely on chance, her success or in success in maneuvering a man into taking the life-long responsibility of her."  Similarly, Cridge writes about degraded women whose only "business is to get married," and in her satiric Men's Rights, in which Victorian roles of men and women are reversed, a father tells his son that all he has to do is "learn to be a good housekeeper; for you will be married one day and have to attend to your children."  Cridge asks herself "why are they in this pitiable condition?" presenting her stance on marriage through fiction rather than pure criticism.
Furthermore, Cridge was a precursor to Virginia Woolf of the female phase, from 1930 to today, as Woolf believed that masculine and feminine writing is inherently different. Cridge wrote "feminine" fiction rather than "masculine" journalism, and explored domestic, marriage, and single life for women in comparison to men -- all focuses of Woolf's criticism. Also, Cridge and Woolf both write as creative-writers-as-critics and use the stream-of-consciousness technique.

References 

American suffragists
1825 births
1875 deaths
British emigrants to the United States
People from Dayton, Ohio
19th-century American newspaper publishers (people)
Women science fiction and fantasy writers

External links